Glyphipterix lycnophora is a species of sedge moth in the genus Glyphipterix. It was described by Alfred Jefferis Turner in 1913. It is found in Australia.

The Global Lepidoptera Names Index considers it to be a synonym of Glyphipterix autopetes.

References

Moths described in 1913
Glyphipterigidae
Moths of Australia